Vandalur railway station is one of the railway stations of the Chennai Beach–Chengalpattu section of the Chennai Suburban Railway Network. It serves the neighbourhood of Vandalur, a suburb of Chennai.

History
The lines at the station were electrified on 9 January 1965, with the electrification of the Tambaram—Chengalpattu section.

See also

 Chennai Suburban Railway
 Railway stations in Chennai

References

External links
 Vandalur railway station at Indiarailinfo.com
 Local Train timings from/to Vandalur

Stations of Chennai Suburban Railway
Railway stations in Chennai
Railway stations in Kanchipuram district